Chlorophytum inornatum is a flowering plant species in the genus Chlorophytum. It is the type species of its genus.
It is related to the commonly known plant Chlorophytum also referred to as a "spider plant".
3-(4'-Methoxybenzyl)-7,8-methylenedioxy-chroman-4-one, a homoisoflavanone with antimycobacterial activity, can be isolated from C. inornatum.

References

External links 

Agavoideae
Plants described in 1807